Zucchelli Station is an Italian seasonal research station, located at Terra Nova Bay in Antarctica on a granitic headland along the coast of the Northern Foothills to north-east of Gerlache Inlet. It has been named after Mario Zucchelli, director of the activities, which conducted for sixteen years, for the ENEA-Unità Tecnica Antartide as part of the National Antarctic Research Program (PNRA).

The main functions carried out by the Station are:
 logistic support to scientific personnel operating in remote fields
 logistical and operational support to the oceanographic ship
 support to research activities with laboratories and instrumentation
 support to personnel and material in transit for Concordia Station
 support to air operations

Description
In 2010, the Station was enlarged and in the austral summer the traverse leave for Concordia Station operated jointly with France.

Main building
The main building was built in 1985, in the first seasonal expedition, on a steel structure  from the ground and consist of 82 containers, 42 of which used for the personnel accommodation and services while the remaining 40 to the support activities as:
 operations room situated on the top of the building, like a control tower, looking over the base
 communications room, adjacent to the operation room to facilitate the HF radio and the satellite radio transmissions
 calculation room which give informatics support and data transmission, 
offices, 
 laboratories (chemistry, biology, geology, electronics), 
 cafeteria, 
 kitchen, 
 emergency, 
 infirmary, 
 laundry.

Technical plants

 aquarium
 boat storage
 carpentry
 co-generation system for the exploitation of the thermal energy produced by the power plant
 deposit for vehicles
 desalination plant
 diving chamber
 electrical and mechanical workshop
 fuel storage
 helipads 
 incinerator plant
 materials warehouse
 nitrogen and helium liquefiers
 power and thermal energy plant (four diesel generators)
 shredder and compactor plant
 wastewater treatment plant

Research activity

 cosmic ray observations
 geodesy
 geomagnetic observations
 glaciology
 ionospheric/auroral observations
 meteorological observations
 oceanography
 offshore marine biology
 onshore geology
 seismology and environmental monitoring
 terrestrial biology

Icaro Camp
The camp consists of two blue containers, held by guy-wires, meteorological equipment, solar panels and a wind generator. Although the structures are not suited to accommodate people, they could shelter a dozen in case of emergency.

Transportation

Boulder Clay Runway
The Italian team usually use an Ice Runway in the Gerlache Inlet to start the summer campaign but in recent years the ice runway was closed earlier then before because of the ice thickness had diminished due to partial melting of the ice. The airstrip is situated on the Boulder Clay Moraine and is built with the least environmental impact as possible. The airfield will be completed with a taxiway which connect the apron with the runway, an apron for aircraft parking and operational tasks, capable of stationing two C-130 Hercules, fire service as ICAO standards, fuel deposit, terminal and shed for the personnel, operation room and a power unit. The reduced thickness of the ice in the Ross Sea did not allowed to the heavier C-130J Hercules of the Italian Air Force to land on the sea ice runway. On 22 November 2022 at 4.30 CET a C-130J landed for the first time on the prepared gravel runway. Boulder Clay Runway will become an international hub as it can be utilised by the other nearby research stations.

Enigma Lake Skiway
The skyway is prepared by removing the snow accumulated in the winter by the Station staff; in the same place stands an AWS (Rita) which makes part of the network managed by the Antarctic Meteo-Climatological Weather Observatory.

Zucchelli Ice Runway
Zucchelli Ice Runway is located in the Gerlache Inlet and is prepared, at the beginning of each season, by the station's logistic personnel in mid-October. The sea ice runway is suitable for operating the Aeronautica Militare or Safair wheeled C-130, but in the latest years it was closed earlier than before because the sea ice break up.

Climate

AWS Network
The Antarctic Meteo-Climatological Weather Observatory, established in 1985, attempt to a give a contribution to understand the climate change through the study of the atmospheric dynamics. The programme is defined by two projects supported by the National Antarctic Research Program (PNRA), one regarding the Victoria Land and the other the Concordia Station, carried out by the ENEA personnel. The centre run an Automatic weather station network, distributed through the territory, having the responsibility of the instrumentation assembly, the maintenance and the data collection. 
The network include 16 AW stations operating all year around: 

 Alessandra (Cape King), 
 Arelis (Cape Ross), 
 Concordia Station, 
 Eneide (Terra Nova Bay) 
 Giulia (Mid Point), 
 Irene (Sitry), 
 Jennica (Terra Nova Bay), 
 Lola (Tourmaline Plateau), 
 Maria (Browning Pass), 
 Modesta (Priestley Glacier), 
 Paola (Talos Dome), 
 Rita (Enigma Lake), 
 Silvia (Cape Phillips), 
 Sofia (Nansen Ice Sheet), 
 Sofiab (David Glacier), 
 Zoraida (Priestley Glacier).

See also
 List of Antarctic research stations
 List of Antarctic field camps
 Airports in Antarctica
 Concordia Station operated by France and Italy
 Jang Bogo Station a South Korean station in Terra Nova Bay

Gallery

References

External links

 COMNAP Antarctic Facilities
 COMNAP Antarctic Facilities Map
 Mario Zucchelli Station - pdf
 Mario Zucchelli Station (English Text)
 

Outposts of Antarctica
Outposts of the Ross Dependency
Italy and the Antarctic
Victoria Land
Scott Coast
1985 establishments in Antarctica